Ansett New Zealand Flight 703 was a scheduled flight from Auckland to Palmerston North. On 9 June 1995, the de Havilland Canada Dash 8-100 aircraft crashed into the Tararua Range on approach to Palmerston North. The flight attendant and three passengers died as a result of the crash; the two pilots and 15 passengers survived.

While conducting an instrument approach in inclement weather, the aircraft's right main landing gear failed to extend and the captain decided to continue the approach while the first officer performed the alternate extension procedure. Distracted with the first officer's attempt to lower the gear, the captain allowed the aircraft to drift off-profile towards the Tararua Range. Due to reasons unknown, the ground proximity warning system sounded with insufficient warning for the pilots to avert the accident.

Aircraft and crew 

The aircraft involved was De Havilland Dash 8-100, serial number 055, registered as  It entered into service in December 1986, and had accumulated 22,154 flight hours and 24,976 flight cycles. The Dash 8 is a high-wing turboprop aircraft, with the main landing gear located below and retracting into the engine nacelles. As a result, the main landing gear is easily visible from the passenger cabin.

The captain was 40-year-old Garry Norman Sotheran, who had 7,765 flight hours, including 273 on the Dash 8. The first officer was 33-year-old Barry Brown, who had 6,460 flight hours, including 341 on the Dash 8. The flight attendant was 31-year-old Karen Anne Gallagher from Christchurch.

Accident
Flight 703 took off from Auckland Airport at 08:17 AM with 18 passengers and three crew on board. Approaching its destination, Palmerston North Airport, the pilots briefed for a preferred VOR/DME instrument approach to runway 07, with a circling approach to runway 25 if needed. However, due to departing traffic, air traffic control instead cleared Flight 703 for the VOR/DME approach to runway 25.

Once on the final approach, the captain (as pilot flying) called for the landing gear to be lowered. Thirty seconds later, the first officer noticed on the landing gear indicator that the right main landing gear was not down and locked. The captain ordered for the alternate gear extension procedure, and told the first officer to whip through the procedure and "see if we can get it out of the way before it's too late". After passengers also noticed the landing gear was not fully extended, the flight attendant communicated with the pilots to inform them of the situation. 

The first officer referred to the aircraft's quick reference handbook (QRH) for the procedure, which required the pilot to open the alternate release door, pull down on the main gear release handle inside to operate the gear uplock, and then insert the handle into the manual hydraulic pump and operate it until the main gear was fully extended. The first officer however missed the step of pulling the release handle, to which the captain said "You're supposed to pull the handle...". The first officer pulled the handle and said "Yeah that's pulled here we go."

The distraction of the landing gear alternate extension procedure saw the aircraft inadvertently allowed to descend too low toward the range. Less than ten seconds after the first officer pulled the manual release handle, the ground proximity warning system (GPWS) sounded. The pilots pulled back on the control column and raised the nose to 8 degrees; before they could fully react to the GPWS alarm, the plane crashed into the Tararua Ranges at 9:22 AM.

Crash site 

Flight 703 flew into rising terrain, striking high ground twice before the final impact and breaking up as it slid along the ground. The fuselage came to rest  from the site of initial impact. The right main landing gear that the pilots were trying to extend was found still in the retracted position.

The flight attendant, who was unrestrained and leaning over a seat back talking to a passenger, was thrown to the floor in the impact and sustained fatal head injuries. Two passengers were mortally wounded from head, chest and spinal injuries associated with the impact. Passenger Reginald John Dixon tried to assist the two wounded passengers trapped near the wing root, as the wreckage caught fire. He received burns to 80% of his body and subsequently died from his injuries 12 days later. For his bravery in a dangerous situation, Dixon was awarded the New Zealand Cross, New Zealand's highest award for civilian bravery. In total, three passengers and the flight attendant were killed; twelve passengers and both pilots sustained serious injuries, while the remaining three passengers sustained minor injuries. The crash site was a sheep farm, and three sheep were killed during the crash sequence.

A passenger, William McGrory, managed to find his work briefcase that had been thrown from the wreckage and use his mobile phone (an uncommon device in 1995) inside it to call 111. The police passed McGrory's phone number to air traffic control, who in turn made contact with McGrory. Due to the poor visibility, the crash site could only be described as a grassy hill top with a large stock pen nearby. After inquiries with local farmers, air traffic control determined the probable location of the crash in the Tararua Range. Two helicopters searching the area picked up the weak emergency locator transmitter signal from the crashed aircraft, and located the wreckage at 10:19 AM, 57 minutes after the crash, off Hall Block Road on the Woodville side of the range. The survivors were transported by helicopter and road ambulance to Palmerston North Hospital and Wellington Hospital. The last survivor arrived at hospital at 12:07 PM.

Investigation
The Transport Accident Investigation Commission (TAIC) issued its final report into the Flight 703 accident on 4 July 1997. It concluded the causal factors of the accident were:

 the Captain not ensuring the aircraft intercepted and maintained the approach profile during the conduct of the non-precision instrument approach
 the Captain's perseverance with his decision to get the undercarriage lowered without discontinuing the instrument approach
 the Captain's distraction from the primary task of flying the aircraft safely during the First Officer's endeavours to correct an undercarriage malfunction
 the First Officer not executing a Quick Reference Handbook procedure in the correct sequence
 the shortness of the ground proximity warning system warning.

Landing gear uplock failure 
When the landing gear is retracted on a Dash 8, a roller on each main landing gear leg engages with the uplock latch, holding the gear in the retracted position without need for hydraulic power. When the pilots select the landing gear lever down, a hydraulic actuator operates the uplock latch to disengage the roller, and the gear is extended by a combination of gravity and hydraulics. If gear fails to lower, the uplock latch can be operated mechanically by pulling the alternate main gear release handle in the flight deck, while a manual hydraulic pump operates an alternate hydraulic system to assist lowering the gear.

Over time, the latch would wear down from repeated contact with the roller. If the latch is worn, or the roller is not properly lubricated, the roller could jam in the latch and the uplock would not release the landing gear. Aircraft manufacturer De Havilland had issued several service bulletins regarding the risk of gear "hang-ups", and in August 1992, introduced a re-designed uplock actuator assembly to minimise failures. In October 1994, de Havilland issued an All Operator Message discussing a hang-up on another Dash 8 due to a seized roller. In this case, greater force and repeated pulls were required on the alternate main gear release handle to operate the uplock.

The accident aircraft, ZK-NEY, and sister aircraft ZK-NEZ had experienced fifteen incidents between them since their introduction in 1987 when a main landing gear failed to release or was slow to release. In all but three cases, the incidents involved the left main gear. Ansett New Zealand retrofitted the re-designed uplock to NEY's left main gear on 16 April 1995. At the time of the accident, Ansett were awaiting delivery of the required parts to retrofit the right main gear.

Possible radar altimeter malfunction 
According to the TAIC report, an audio alarm telling the crew to climb the aircraft should have sounded 17 seconds before impact, but the GPWS malfunctioned, for reasons that have never been determined. There was an investigation by the New Zealand Police in 2001 into whether or not a mobile phone call from the aircraft may have interfered with the system. The official crash report does mention the following on page 69:"The aircraft manufacturer's avionics representative advised that there was no likelihood that the operation of a computer, other electronic device or a cell phone would have affected the aircraft's flight instruments."Later study of the wreckage of Flight 703 revealed that the antennas for the radar altimeter (which sends a signal to the GPWS indicating how far above the ground the aircraft is) had been painted and this possibly reduced the GPWS' ability to provide a timely alarm, although later comments by TAIC insisted the paint did not block or reflect signals. Radar altimeter antennas are clearly embossed with the words, "do not paint", a warning that was not heeded. Bench testing of the radar altimeter proved the unit was still functioning perfectly after its recovery from the wreckage.

The captain's defence was that 4.5 seconds before impact the radar altimeter display flipped 1,000 feet in altitude as he watched.

Aftermath 
In April 2000, Captain Garry Sotheran was charged with four counts of manslaughter and three counts of injuring passengers. After a six-week trial at the Palmerston North High Court in June 2001, the jury found Sotheran not guilty on all charges.

In popular culture 
Ansett New Zealand Flight 703 was dramatised in the 8th episode of Season 21 on the show Mayday titled "Caught in a Jam".

See also

 List of accidents and incidents involving commercial aircraft
 Eastern Air Lines Flight 401, Another plane which descended and crashed while trying to fix a landing gear problem.

References

Further reading 

Aviation accidents and incidents in 1995
Airliner accidents and incidents involving controlled flight into terrain
Airliner accidents and incidents caused by pilot error
Accidents and incidents involving the De Havilland Canada Dash 8
Aviation accidents and incidents in New Zealand
1995 in New Zealand
Ansett New Zealand accidents and incidents
June 1995 events in New Zealand
1995 disasters in New Zealand